One International Place is a Postmodern skyscraper in the Financial District of Boston, Massachusetts. Built in 1987, and designed by Johnson/Burgee Architects – whose principals are Philip Johnson and John Burgee – it is Boston's 7th-tallest building, standing 600 feet (183 m) tall and housing 46 floors. The building is very prominent in the city's skyline, particularly when viewed from Boston Harbor.

The building has three separate elements. These consist of the tower itself, as well as two smaller components (27- and 19-stories). It also is linked by a central dome and winter garden with Two International Place.

See also
List of tallest buildings in Boston
Two International Place

References

External links

One International Place
Emporis.com

Skyscraper office buildings in Boston
Philip Johnson buildings
Financial District, Boston
John Burgee buildings
Office buildings completed in 1987